Nixchen may refer to:
 Nixchen (1926 film), a German silent film
 Nixchen (1920 film), a German silent film